A Welsh hook is a type of polearm, a halberd-like weapon with a hook on the back, and gained its name due to its prevalence among the Welsh soldiers during the medieval wars against the English. It appears to have been derived from an agricultural implement known as a forest-bill (or a long hedging-bill) with the addition of a hook on the back and a spike on the front.

In literature
"That no man presume to wear any weapons, especially Welsh-hooks and forest-bills", ("The History of Sir John Oldcastle", Folio 3, 1664, 60).
Falstaff "My own knee? ... and swore the devil his true liegeman upon the cross of a Welsh hook,—What, a plague, call you him?", (Shakespeare Henry IV Part 1, 290).

Notes

References

Medieval polearms
History of Wales